The 2013 Wexford Senior Hurling Championship was the 103rd staging of the Wexford Senior Hurling Championship since its establishment in 1889. The championship ended on 20 October 2013.

Oulart–The Ballagh were the reigning champions, and successfully defended their title following a 3-12 to 1-16 defeat of Ferns St Aidan's in the final.

Results

Quarter-finals

Semi-finals

Final

Championship statistics

Miscellaneous

 Oulart–The Ballagh made history by claiming a record-breaking fifth successive championship.

References

Wexford Senior Hurling Championship
Wexford Senior Hurling Championship